The 1986–87 Iowa Hawkeyes men's basketball team represented the University of Iowa as members of the Big Ten Conference. The team was led by first-year head coach Tom Davis and played their home games at Carver-Hawkeye Arena. They finished the season 30–5 overall and 14–4 in Big Ten play to finish in third place. The Hawkeyes won their first 18 games and ascended to the first #1 ranking in school history in late January. The 30 overall wins and 14 conference wins remain single-season school records. Iowa received an at-large bid to the NCAA tournament as #2 seed in the West Region. After defeating Santa Clara in the first round, UTEP in the second round, and Oklahoma in a thrilling Sweet Sixteen matchup, they lost to #1 UNLV in the West Regional Final, 84–81.

Roster

Schedule and results

|-
!colspan=9 style=| Regular Season
|-

|-
!colspan=9 style=|NCAA Tournament

Rankings

Awards and honors
 Tom Davis, Big Ten Men's Basketball Coach of the Year and AP College Basketball Coach of the Year

Team players in the 1987 NBA Draft

Overall, eight players from this team were selected in the NBA Draft.

References

Iowa
Iowa Hawkeyes men's basketball seasons
Iowa
Iowa Hawkeyes basketball, men's
Iowa Hawkeyes basketball, men's